Balgudar is a village Located in Lakhisarai District of Bihar, India, with total 1200 families residing. The total population of the village is 7,326, in which 3654 are males while 3672 are females. Child Sex Ratio for the Balgudar as per census is 1044, higher than Bihar average of 935. Balgudar village has lower literacy rate compared to Bihar. In 2011, literacy rate of Balgudar village was 59.13 % compared to 61.80% of Bihar. In Balgudar male literacy stands at 67.34% while female literacy rate was 50.89%. This village is situated near the temple called 'Ashok dham'.

Balgudar village is administered by a sarpanch (head of village) who is the elected representative of village.

The total working population is 41.11% of the total population, including 61.23% of the men and 19.57% of the women.

References

Villages in Lakhisarai district